The O-Train is a light-rail transit (LRT) system in Ottawa, Ontario, Canada operated by OC Transpo consisting of two lines and 17 stations. The Confederation Line is fully grade-separated and consists of 13 stations including 3 underground stations. The Trillium Line is a diesel light-rail transit (DLRT) service. It is isolated from road traffic, but shared with other trains; after operating hours the track has been infrequently used by Ottawa Central for freight service to the National Research Council.

Stage 2 will see the O-Train system expanded south, east, and west, with 24 new stations added to the existing lines.

Stations

Under construction

Stage 2 is a planned extension to the O-Train network which will add an additional 8 stations to the Trillium Line and 16 to the Confederation Line.

Construction of the Airport spur extension on the Trillium Line began in 2019.

Proposed stations

The city has also begun planning future expansions including an extension to Kanata and Barrhaven. The environmental assessment for the Kanata extension, which could see up to 8 stations added, was completed in April 2018. A study to extend the line into Barrhaven is also underway with a preliminary alignment presented on October 30, 2019. On September 9, 2020, the selected alignment was presented for an online consultation. The updated alignment included the selection of an elevated guideway between Tallwood and Nepean Sportsplex station.

As part of the Stage 2 extensions, accommodations are also being made for several future infill stations including three on the Trillium Line between Limebank and Bowesville, and three on the extended Confederation Line.

Notes

References

External links 
 O-Train and Transitway system map

Lists of railway stations in Canada
Ottawa-related lists